Acyl-coenzyme A synthetase ACSM2B, mitochondrial is an enzyme that in humans is encoded by the ACSM2B gene.

References

External links

Further reading

Human proteins